Asia Harris (born 23 December 2004 in Pontefract) is an English professional squash player. As of October 2022, she was ranked number 119 in the world. She is coached by Nick Matthew. She won the 2022 Mirabelles International.

References

2004 births
Living people
English female squash players